Bannanje Govindacharya (3 August 1936 – 13 December 2020) was an Indian philosopher and Sanskrit scholar versed in Veda Bhashya, Upanishad Bhashya, Mahabharata, Puranas and Ramayana. He wrote Bhashyas (commentaries) on Veda Suktas, Upanishads, ShataRudriya, BrahmaSutra Bhashya, Gita Bhashya and was an orator. He was awarded the Padma Shri by the Government of India in 2009.

Early life

Govindacharya was born on August 3, 1936, in the Bannanje neighborhood of Udupi, in present-day southern Indian state of Karnataka. He started his Vedic studies under his father, Tarkakesari S. Narayanacharya, and went on to study under Vidyamanya Tirtha Swamiji of the Palimaru Matha and Vidyasamudra Tirtha Swamiji of the Kaneyur Matha, both in Udupi. He later studied under Vishwesha Tirtha of the Pejawara Matha.

Career

Vedic studies 
Govindacharya was a Sanskrit scholar versed in Veda Bhashya, Upanishad Bhashya, Mahabharata, Puranas and Ramayana. He wrote Bhashyas, or commentaries on Veda Suktas, Upanishads, ShataRudriya, BrahmaSutra Bhashya, and Gita Bhashya. He was also an orator. He wrote new Vyakarana Sutras where Panini left and also did vyakhyana for the words written before Pāṇini. He sought to integrate ideas from philosophical texts to understand the texts composed by Vedavyasa. He was an exponent of Bhaagavata chintana and commented on the philosophical meaning of Bhagavata and other Puranas. Though by birth he was the follower of Madhvacharya, he had studied Mayavada and other philosophies before reading Madhvacharya's Tattvavaada. He spoke both Sanskrit and Kannada. He has around 4000 pages of Sanskrit Vyakhyana to his name with around 150 books, including those in other languages. He wrote a screenplay for the Sanskrit film "Bhagavadgita" and Shankaracharya. He had experience in the Madhvas Tattvavada or Madhva philosophy. He is best known for his pravachanas (discourses), which are very popular among Tuluvas and Kannadigas all over the world. His pravachanas (discourses) have made him a household name among Tuluvas and Kannadigas. He also wrote on this Naaku-Tanti. His literary achievements also include his translation and commentaries of the complete texts of Shri Madhwacharya. He was awarded the Padma Shri by the Government of India in 2009.

Preservation of manuscripts
In 2005–2006, Professor P.R. Mukund (a disciple of Sri Bannanje) along with his colleague Dr. Roger Easton from the Rochester Institute of Technology in New York and Dr. Keith Knox of the Boeing Corporation in Hawaii, undertook the imaging and preserving of the original Sarvamoola Granthas authored by Madhvacharya. Knox and Easton had earlier imaged fragments of the Dead Sea scrolls and are on the imaging team for the Archimedes Palimpsest project. Bannanje regarded this task as a project of enormous importance and was using the images in his studies of the manuscript.

Other contributions
Govindcharya also served as the editor at Udayavani early in his life. He wrote a book on the life of Shree Madhwa acharya called Acharya Madhva: Baduku-Bareha. It was published by RastraKavi Govinda Pai Samshodhana Kendra, Udupi.

Bannanje Acharyaru also propagated and preserved the Chaturdasha Bhajans, 14 songs in Sanskrit penned by Acharya Madhwa's direct disciples and prominent followers of his philosophy.

He also made contributions to the Indian and Kannada film industries. He wrote script in Sanskrit for G V Iyer's movies Bhagavadgeeta, Adi Shankaracharya, Shri Madhwacharya, and Sri Ramanujacharya. He also wrote the scripts for the Adi Shankaracharya and Madhwacharya movies. Adi Shankaracharya incidentally was the first movie made in Sanskrit.

Works
Shri Bannanje Govindacharya made many contributions to Vedic scholarship. He authored numerous commentaries, translations and original works on the subject. He also contributed hundreds of articles in magazines and journals.

Publications edited
Works of Madhwa: This work is a reconstruction of the complete commentary on Madhwa's works by Shri Hrishikesha Tirtha, a direct disciple of Shri Madhwacharya of the 13th CE. It comprises 2000 pages in five volumes complete with footnotes and colophons. Two other works of Shri Madhwacharya, Tithinirnaya and Nyasa Paddhathi which were unknown were discovered and included in this great work.

Translation of major Sanskrit works into Kannada
Apart from the Vedic texts, Shri Bannanje also translated several other Sanskrit works into Kannada. These include,
 Bana Bhattana kadambari - A translation of Bāṇabhaṭṭa's novel
 Kalidasa's Shakuntala
 Shudraka's Mrichakatika as Aaveya Mannina Atada Bandi, won the Sahitya Akademi's award for translation in 2001
 Bhavabhuti's Uttaramacharita
 Mahashweta's Sanskrit stories
 Several Sanskrit poems.

Short commentaries in Sanskrit
 Anandamala of shri trivikramarya dasa
 Vayu Stuti of Shri Trivikrama Pandita
 Vishnu Stuti of Shri Trivikrama Pandita
 Chaturdashastotra – different stotras in Sanskrit
 Raghavendra stotra 
 Jayathirtha stuti
 Vada ratnavali of Shri Vishudasacharya
 A philosophical dialectic in Sanskrit
 Short commentaries for six upanishads with commentaries of Trivikramarya Dasa

Detailed commentaries in Sanskrit
Some of Bannanje's detailed commentaries in Sanskrit include,
 Nirnaya Bhava Chandrika Tippani on Mahabharata Tatparya Nirnaya by Shri Madhvacharya
 Teeka (critique) on Mahabharata Tatparya (yamaka bharatha) by Shri Madhvacharya
 Teeka on Shri Madhwavijaya of Narayana Pandita
 Tippani on Bhagavata Tatparya Nirnaya by Shri Madhvacharya

Translation of Sanskrit to Kannada
 Purusha sukta
 Śrī Sūkta
 Shiva stuti 
 Narashimha stuti
 Talavakaropanishad (Kenopanishad)
 Krishnamritamaharnava of Madhvacharya
 Tantra sara sangraha of Madhvacharya
 Sangraha Ramayana of Shri Narayana Panditacharya
 Madhwa Ramayana
 Parashara kanda para tattva (Kannada rendering of Shri Vishnu Purana)
 Prameya nava malika of Shri Narayana Panditacharya
 Anu Madhwa Charita & Sampradaya paddhati
 Mangalashtaka of Shri Rajarajeshwara yati
 Yajneeya mantropanishat (Ishavasya)
 Bhagavad Gita
 Ananda Thirthara Bhakti Geetegalu (Kannada rendering of Shri Madhwacharya's Sanskrit devotional songs.

Death 
Govindacharya died on December 13, 2020, at his home in Ambalpadi in Udupi. He was aged 85. His death was caused by a Heart Attack

Recognition and honours
Bannanje won numerous awards and various titles were conferred on him by esteemed institutions. Some of these include
 Padma Shri, India's fourth highest civilian honour, 2009
 The state award conferred by the Government of Karnataka for his meritorious service and scholarship in Vedic literature and philosophy.
 The Sahitya Akademi's award for translation in 2001
 Vidya Vachaspati - by Shri Admar Mutt swamiji, Udupi
 Pratibhambudhi - conferred on him by Puttige Mutt and Palimar Mutt swamijis
 Shastra savyasachi - a title conferred by Akhila Bharata Madhwa Maha Mandala, Bengalooru
 Shri Krishanugraha Prashasthi - an award presented by Pejavara Mutt swamiji
 Sahitya sarvabhouma -  saraswata maha vishwa vidyalaya, Bengalooru
 Samshodhana Vichakshana : by Shri Admar & Shri Palimar Mutt
 Pandita Ratna : by Palimar Mutt swamiji
 Pandita shiromani  - by Pratibha Ranga, Shivamogga
 Pandita Ratna : by H.H. Shrimad Dwarakanath swamiji of Gokarna Mutt, Partagali-Goa
 Vidya Ratnakara - title conferred by Shri Palimar Mutt swamiji
 The Academy of General Education, Manipal presented him with a fellowship for the meritorious service and scholarship in Indian religion and philosophy.
 Veda Vyasya Sanman : by Sree Ramaseva Mandali, Chamarajapet, Bangalore

Conferences attended
 Brand Ambassador of India in World Conference on Religion & Peace, Princeton, USA in 1979.
 Participated in World Sanskrit Conference in Delhi in the 1980s.
 Was president to Sanskrit Parishat of South Canara.
 Served as President of All India Madhwa Sammelanna in Chennai in 1995.
 Served as President of the Sahitya Sammelanna in Udupi in 2001.
 Participated in number of poetic symposiums and debates.

See also
 Dvaita
 Ashta Mathas of Udupi

References

External links
 ("Govindamala : Philosophical Discourse by Dr. Bannañje Govindācārya", is a Facebook Page. An effort to introduce to all Spiritual aspirants, each one of Acharyas, Philosophical discourse. Stay Tuned.... )
 TARA PRAKASHANA (contains many articles on Poojya Shri Achaaryaru )
 A lecture series on the Mandukopanishat
 Guru Govindaacharya - Prof. Easton writes about his interactions with Bannanje during the imaging of the Sarvamoola Granthas
 Bannanje Govindacharya Interview, 'Is the Ego an Illusion?'
 VNN World - Interview With Sri Bannanje Govindacharya
 madhva.net - shrI Bannanje Govindacharya
 Pravachana on "Bhagavadgeetha " by Vidyavachaspathi, Padmashree Bannanje Govinda Acharya
 Sample Audio clips-1 of Shri Bannanje Govindacharya
 Sample Audio clips-2 of Shri Bannanje Govindacharya

20th-century Hindu religious leaders
21st-century Hindu religious leaders
Indian Sanskrit scholars
Dvaita Vedanta
Recipients of the Padma Shri in literature & education
People from Udupi
Dvaitin philosophers
Mangaloreans
2020 deaths
Tulu people
1936 births
Recipients of the Sahitya Akademi Prize for Translation